Rachel Elizabeth Brosnahan (born July 12, 1990) is an American actress. She stars as aspiring stand-up comedian Miriam "Midge" Maisel in the Amazon Prime Video period comedy series The Marvelous Mrs. Maisel (2017–present), for which she won a Primetime Emmy Award for Outstanding Lead Actress in a Comedy Series in 2018 and two consecutive Golden Globe Awards for Best Actress – Television Series Musical or Comedy in 2018 and 2019. She also had a recurring role in the Netflix political thriller series House of Cards (2013–2015) as Rachel Posner, for which she received a Primetime Emmy Award nomination, and played a lead role in the WGN drama series Manhattan (2014–2015).

She made her film debut in the horror film The Unborn (2009), and has appeared in films including Beautiful Creatures (2013), Louder Than Bombs (2015), The Finest Hours (2016), Patriots Day (2016), The Courier (2020), and I'm Your Woman (2020).

Early life
Brosnahan was born in Milwaukee, Wisconsin, to Carol and Earl Brosnahan, who worked in children's publishing. Her mother is British and her father is American and of Irish descent. From age four, Brosnahan was raised in Highland Park, Illinois. She has a younger brother and sister. She is a niece of the late fashion designer Kate Spade (née Brosnahan).

Though she is well known for playing a Jewish character on television (Mrs. Maisel in The Marvelous Mrs. Maisel), Brosnahan herself is not of Jewish descent. She says she was "happily immersed" in Jewish culture thanks to the community of Highland Park, Illinois.

She attended Wayne Thomas Elementary School and Northwood Junior High School. She performed in musical theater during junior high and high school. At Highland Park High School, she was on the wrestling team for two years and was a snowboarding instructor. When she was 16, she took a class with Carole Dibo, director of Wilmette's Actors Training Center, who is now Brosnahan's manager. Brosnahan graduated from New York University’s Tisch School of the Arts in 2012.

Career
While still in high school, Brosnahan received her first movie role—that of Lisa in the Michael Bay-produced horror film The Unborn (2009). In college, she appeared in single episodes of television series such as Gossip Girl, The Good Wife, Grey's Anatomy, and In Treatment. After college, she began landing recurring roles in series such as the crime thriller The Blacklist (2014) and the short-lived medical drama Black Box (2014).

She first appeared on stage in 2009 in Up at Steppenwolf Theatre followed by her Broadway debut in The Big Knife with Roundabout Theatre Company in 2013. In 2016 she played Desdemona in Othello at New York Theatre Workshop opposite David Oyelowo and Daniel Craig.

In 2013, she starred as Rachel Posner in the critically acclaimed Netflix political drama House of Cards with Kevin Spacey and Robin Wright. Although she was initially booked for only two episodes, she caught the eye of showrunner Beau Willimon, and her character was significantly expanded. Her role brought her career prominence, and she received a Primetime Emmy Award nomination for Outstanding Guest Actress in a Drama Series.

In 2016, she appeared in Woody Allen's Amazon series Crisis in Six Scenes with Allen, Elaine May and Miley Cyrus.

Since 2017, she has appeared as the title character in the Amazon period comedy series The Marvelous Mrs. Maisel. She has said that her exposure to Jewish culture growing up helped prepare her for the role of Midge Maisel, a 1950s Jewish housewife who pursues a career in stand-up comedy when her marriage fails. Her performance has earned her a Primetime Emmy Award for Outstanding Lead Actress In A Comedy Series, two Golden Globe Awards, two Screen Actors Guild Awards, and two Critics' Choice Television Awards, among other accolades.
After her Emmy Award win, Brosnahan said that The Marvelous Mrs. Maisel resonated with viewers because "the show is equal parts fantasy and reality. It has beautiful clothes, beautiful sets. I think in some ways it's aspirational too. It's about a woman who's reinventing herself after completing the dream she had laid out for herself. Everything falls apart; she finds herself anew. It's never too late to do that. And it's funny and, I think, filled with joy at its core, and that's something we need a lot more of in the world right now."

Brosnahan appeared in the drama film The Courier with Benedict Cumberbatch, released in January 2020. In December 2020, Amazon released I'm Your Woman, in which she starred with Arinzé Kene. In 2022, she starred in the western Dead for a Dollar which premiered at the 79th Venice International Film Festival.

In 2023, she is set to star in the revival of Lorraine Hansberry's The Sign in Sidney Brustein's Window opposite Oscar Isaac at the Brooklyn Academy of Music.

Personal life
It was reported in 2018 that Brosnahan had married actor Jason Ralph, but she later revealed in January 2019 that they had been married "for years" before their relationship became public. Both attended the 76th Golden Globe Awards ceremony in 2019, where she thanked him during her acceptance speech.

Brosnahan has twice completed the "Live Below the Line" challenge.

Filmography

Film

Television

Theatre

Awards and nominations

References

External links

 

1990 births
21st-century American actresses
People from Highland Park, Illinois
Actresses from Illinois
Actresses from Milwaukee
American film actresses
American people of British descent
American people of Irish descent
American television actresses
American voice actresses
Best Musical or Comedy Actress Golden Globe (television) winners
Living people
Outstanding Performance by a Female Actor in a Comedy Series Screen Actors Guild Award winners
Outstanding Performance by a Lead Actress in a Comedy Series Primetime Emmy Award winners
Tisch School of the Arts alumni